The 2008 season was the 98th edition of the football club Sport Club Corinthians Paulista, their debut in Série B.

Club

Management

Team kit
The team kit for the season was produced by Nike and the shirt sponsor was  Medial Saúde.

Squad

Transfers
For recent transfers, see transfers 2007/2008

Statistics
Last updated on 2008-10-24

Season

Pre-season & Friendlies

Matches

Campeonato Paulista

Matches

Classification

Results summary

Pld = Matches played; W = Matches won; D = Matches drawn; L = Matches lost;

Copa do Brasil

First round

Second round

Round of 16

Quarter-finals

Semi-finals

Final

Campeonato Brasileiro Série B

Matches

Classification

Results summary

Results by round

External links
First Squad 
Fixtures and results 
Fixtures and results · UOL.com.br 
Fixtures · Globo.com 
Fixtures/Squad · Corinthians.com.br 
News · Corinthians.com.br 

2008
Brazilian football clubs 2008 season